Willem Klaas Hoekzema (born 21 July 1939) is a retired Dutch politician of the People's Party for Freedom and Democracy (VVD) and economist.

Decorations

References

External links

Official
  Drs. W.K. (Willem) Hoekzema Parlement & Politiek
  Drs. W.K. Hoekzema (VVD) Eerste Kamer der Staten-Generaal

 
 

 
 

1939 births
Living people
Chairmen of the People's Party for Freedom and Democracy
Dutch nonprofit directors
Mayors in Drenthe
People from Coevorden
People from Den Helder
Mayors in North Holland
People from Huizen
Members of the Provincial Council of Utrecht
Members of the Senate (Netherlands)
Municipal councillors in Utrecht (province)
People from Bedum
People's Party for Freedom and Democracy politicians
State Secretaries for Defence of the Netherlands
University of Groningen alumni
20th-century Dutch economists
20th-century Dutch educators
20th-century Dutch politicians
21st-century Dutch economists
21st-century Dutch educators
21st-century Dutch politicians